Vysokaye , rural localities in Belarus, may refer to:

 Vysokaye, Byaroza District, Brest Region, a village
 Vysokaye, Kamenets District, Brest Region, a town
 Vysokaye, Malaryta District, Brest Region, a village
 Vysokaye, Pinsk District, Brest Region, a village
 Vysokaye, Stolin District, Brest Region, a village
 Vysokaye, Khoiniki District, Gomel Region, a village
 Vysokaye, Rahachow District, Gomel Region, a village
 Vysokaye, Krupki District, Minsk Region, a village
 Vysokaye, Smalyavichy District, Minsk Region, a village
 Vysokaye, Valozhyn District, Minsk Region, a village
 Vysokaye, Chavusy District, Mogilev Region, a village
 Vysokaye, Kastsyukovichy District, Mogilev Region, a village
 Vysokaye, Klimavichy District, Mogilev Region, a agrotown
 Vysokaye, Krychaw District, Mogilev Region, a village
 Vysokaye (agrotown), Orsha District, Vitebsk Region, a agrotown
 Vysokaye (settlement), Orsha District, Vitebsk Region, a settlement

See also
 Vysokoye (disambiguation)
 Vysoke (disambiguation)

be:Высокае (значэнні)